Harnasie, Op. 55, is a ballet-pantomime written by the Polish composer Karol Szymanowski between 1923 and 1931, to a libretto by Jerzy Rytard and his wife and Jarosław Iwaszkiewicz, the librettist of Symanowski's opera, King Roger.

The story is set in the Tatra mountains and is based on the legend of the abduction of a bride by the robber Harnaś and his band (the "Harnasie" of the title). Szymanowski first visited Zakopane in the Tatras in 1921 and studied the music and folklore of the Gorals people. The score makes extensive use of folk-song and employs a choir with tenor solo.

The ballet  comprises two acts, preceded by a prelude. There are only three principal characters: a shepherd, a girl and the robber (Harnaś). In the first scene, the shepherd is driving his sheep to pasture and the girl encounters Harnaś. In the second scene, Harnaś kidnaps the girl from her wedding. The third scene, in the robber's den, concludes in an epilogue with a lively dance.

The ballet was first performed in 1935 in Prague. A year later it was presented in Paris by the dancer and choreographer Serge Lifar. There it proved an exceptional success for Szymanowski nearly a year before his death. The Polish premiere took place in Poznań in 1938.

Themes

References

External links 
 

Ballets by Serge Lifar
Ballets by Karol Szymanowski
1935 ballet premieres
Ballets set in Poland
Compositions by Karol Szymanowski
1931 compositions